HMS Bodenham was one of 93 ships of the  of inshore minesweepers. In 1967 she was transferred to the newly-independent country of South Yemen renamed Al Saqr. She was renamed Jihla in 1975 and discarded in 1984.

Construction and design
HMS Bodenham (originally planned to be named Green Chaffinch) was ordered from Brooke Marine of Lowestoft on 29 September 1950 as part of the first series of Ham-class inshore minesweepers. Armament consisted of a single Bofors 40 mm L/60 gun or Oerlikon 20 mm cannon, although the ships armed with Bofors guns were usually rearmed with Oerlikons. The ships had a complement of two officers and 13 ratings.

Bodenham was launched on 21 August 1952, and was completed on 23 September 1953.

Service
The Ham class were too small to carry modern minesweeping equipment and in particular, lacked the electrical generating capacity to power acoustic and magnetic sweep gear, so saw little active use with the Royal Navy. In 1967, South Yemen became independent from the United Kingdom, and three Ham-class minesweepers (Bodenham,  and ) were transferred to the newly established nation's navy. Bodenham was renamed Al Saqr on transfer and Jihla in 1975, and was discarded in 1984.

References

Citations

Sources
 
 Blackman, V.B. Jane's Fighting Ships 1962–63. London: Sampson Low, Marston & Co., Ltd., 1962.
 Blackman, V.B. Jane's Fighting Ships 1971–72. London: Sampson Low, Marston & Co., Ltd., 1971. .
 Gardiner, Roger and Stephen Chumbley. Conway's All The World's Fighting Ships 1947–1995. Annapolis, Maryland, USA: Naval Institute Press, 1995. .
 Worth, Jack. British Warships Since 1945: Part 4 Minesweepers. Liskeard, UK: Maritime Books, 1986. .

Ham-class minesweepers
Ships built in Lowestoft
1952 ships
Cold War minesweepers of the United Kingdom
Royal Navy ship names